Abana or ABANA may refer to:

Places
 Abana, Kastamonu, a district of Kastamonu Province, Turkey
 Barada River, a river near Damascus identified as Abana in the Bible

Other
 Abana (barque), a ship wrecked at Blackpool in 1894
 Abana (leafhopper), a genus of sharpshooter (insect)
 Artist-Blacksmith's Association of North America, a trade association
 Abana Ba Nasery, a defunct Kenyan band
 Abana (film), first-ever Sindhi-language film

People with the surname Abana
 Hisseine Abana (born 1983), Chadian footballer
 Steve Abana (born 1969), Solomon Islands politician